The 2022 Wolffkran Open was a professional tennis tournament played on carpet courts. It was the sixth edition of the tournament which was part of the 2022 ATP Challenger Tour. It took place in Ismaning, Germany between 10 and 16 October 2022.

Singles main draw entrants

Seeds

 1 Rankings are as of 3 October 2022.

Other entrants
The following players received wildcards into the singles main draw:
  Philip Florig
  Max Hans Rehberg
  Marko Topo

The following players received entry into the singles main draw as alternates:
  Evgeny Karlovskiy
  Vitaliy Sachko

The following players received entry from the qualifying draw:
  Matthias Bachinger
  Bu Yunchaokete
  Elmar Ejupovic
  Billy Harris
  Julian Lenz
  Kacper Żuk

Champions

Singles

  Quentin Halys def.  Max Hans Rehberg 7–6(8–6), 6–3.

Doubles

  Michael Geerts /  Patrik Niklas-Salminen def.  Fabian Fallert /  Hendrik Jebens 7–6(7–5), 7–6(10–8).

References

Wolffkran Open
2022
2022 in German tennis
October 2022 sports events in Germany